Namako wall or Namako-kabe (sometimes misspelled as Nameko) is a Japanese wall design widely used for vernacular houses, particularly on fireproof storehouses by the latter half of the Edo period. The namako wall is distinguished by a white grid pattern on black slate. Geographically, it was most prominent in parts of western Japan, notably the San'in region and San'yō region and, from the 19th century, further east, in the Izu Peninsula.

Origin

As the base of the external walls of earthen kura storehouses is vulnerable to physical damage and damage from rain, they are often tiled to protect them. The exaggerated white clay joints that are a few centimetres wide and rounded on top remind people of namako sea cucumber.

Modern uses
During the Meiji period (1868–1912), when Japan imported many Western ideas, the namako wall was used in a way that mimicked the "bricks and mortar" style of these countries. For example, Kisuke Shimizu's Tsukiji Hotel for foreigners in Tokyo Bay (completed in 1868) had namako walls that stretched from the ground to the eaves.

The Misono-za kabuki theatre in Nagoya features a modern namako pattern on the facade.

See also
 Japanese wall

Footnotes

References

External links 

Architectural elements
Architecture in Japan
Types of wall